Yo-Yo was released by Australian hard rock group The Choirboys in 1996 and is the follow-up to their previous studio album, Dancing on the Grave of Rock n' Roll. The album was recorded in Cologne, Germany with producer Peter Blyton. "Solo" was released as a single in December and soon after, drummer Barton Price left the group.

A limited edition twin-CD package of Yo-Yo and Dancing on the Grave of Rock n' Roll was also released. Yo-Yo didn't get the publicity of their early albums and failed to make an impact in the charts when it was released.

Track listing
"Lonely"
"Angeline"
"One Way Street"
"Drops Like a Stone"
"Gone"
"White Trash"
"Solo"
"Can't Believe"
"This Is My Summer"
"Amsterdam"
"Knife"
"Zanzibar"
"Mary's Wall"

Personnel
Choirboys
Mark Gable – vocals, guitars, keyboards
Ian Hulme – vocals, bass guitar
Richard Lara – guitar
Barton Price – drums, percussion, backing vocals

Production details
Producer – Peter Blyton

References

1996 albums
The Choirboys (band) albums